Ivana Gavrilović (born 7 July 1987) is a Dominican radio and television presenter of Serbian origin.

Gavrilović was born in Yugoslavia; after the Yugoslav Wars her mother decided to take her (at 14 years of age) and relocate to the Dominican Republic.

Graduated in 2008 from clinical psychology at the Iberoamerican University, Gavrilović studied communication in Mexico and in the next year she began her radio programme ″Omelette Radio″.

In 2011, she participated in the Luz García's contest "Cuerpos hot del verano".

Media 
Radio
2009–2011 – Omelette Radio (La Rocka, 91.7 FM)
2011–2014 – Omelette Radio (Latidos, 93.7 FM)
2014–2018 – Omelette40,Los 40 Dominican Republic, 103.3 FM)

Television
2010–2013 – TeleNoticias (TeleSistema, Channel 11)
2009–2010 – Conectados (Telecentro Channel 13 )
2017–2018 – Blanca Morena ( Color Visión, Channel 9)
2018– 2019 – Blanca Morena Take Miami ( Color Vision, Channel 9)
2019–present – Show del Medio Dia (Color Vision, Channel 9)
2019–present – Protagonistas con Ivana Gavrilovic ( Color Vision, Channel 9)

References

External links 

http://hoy.com.do/ivana-gavrilovic-y-gabriela-de-la-o-en-blanca-morena/

Living people
1989 births
Dominican Republic people of Serbian descent
Dominican Republic radio personalities
Dominican Republic television presenters
Dominican Republic women television presenters
Serbian expatriates in the Dominican Republic
Universidad Iberoamericana alumni
White Dominicans